Kahurani Gevash (also Romanized as Kahūrānī Gevāsh; also known as Kahūr Āngavāsh, Kahūrān Gevāsh, Tahūrāne Govāsh, and Tahūrān Gevāsh) is a village in Holunchekan Rural District in the Central District of Qasr-e Qand County, Sistan and Baluchestan Province, Iran. At the 2006 census, its population was 186, in 38 families.

References 

Populated places in Qasr-e Qand County